Chebunino is a rural locality (a village) in Nikolotorzhskoye Rural Settlement, Kirillovsky District, Vologda Oblast, Russia. The population was 80 as of 2002.

Geography 
Chebunino is located 26 km east of Kirillov (the district's administrative centre) by road. Nikolsky Torzhok is the nearest rural locality.

References 

Rural localities in Kirillovsky District